Thomas McKenzie was a Scottish professional football centre forward who played in the Scottish League, Southern League and Football League in the early 20th century.

Career 
A centre forward, McKenzie began his professional career with Scottish League First Division club Third Lanark. He was a member of the squads which won the league championship in 1903–04 and the Scottish Cup in 1904–05 and he scored 33 goals in 60 appearances for the club. McKenzie subsequently became a journeyman in English football and played in the Southern and Football Leagues for Sunderland, Plymouth Argyle, Portsmouth, Glossop and Queens Park Rangers.

Honours 
Third Lanark
Scottish League First Division: 1903–04
 Scottish Cup: 1904–05

Career statistics

References

External links 

Footballers from Glasgow
Scottish footballers
English Football League players
Petershill F.C. players
Scottish Football League players
Association football forwards
Third Lanark A.C. players
Sunderland A.F.C. players
Plymouth Argyle F.C. players
Southern Football League players
Portsmouth F.C. players
Year of death missing
Glossop North End A.F.C. players
Queens Park Rangers F.C. players
Dunfermline Athletic F.C. players
1883 births
Scottish Junior Football Association players